Clifford Ray (born January 21, 1949) is an American former professional basketball coach and player who is a consultant for the Houston Rockets of the National Basketball Association (NBA). He played three of his ten seasons in the NBA with the Chicago Bulls from 1971 to 1974, and the other seven with the Golden State Warriors from 1974 to 1981.

Career
Ray played his college basketball at the University of Oklahoma, graduating with a Bachelor of Fine Arts degree (he can play most woodwind instruments). Selected in the third round of the 1971 NBA draft by the Chicago Bulls, Ray was, from the start, a very effective defender and rebounder. Ray was named to the 1972 NBA All-Rookie Team, and led the NBA in rebounds per minute played in each of his first two seasons. He spent three seasons with the Bulls, his best being 1973–74 during which Ray averaged 9.3 points and 12.2 rebounds per game, and the Bulls reached the NBA Western Conference Finals for the first time.

Ray and $100,000 were sent to the Golden State Warriors for Nate Thurmond in an exchange of centers just prior to the 1974–75 season on September 3, 1974. The trade resulted in the Warriors receiving a quality ballplayer who was eight years younger than Thurmond and additional fiscal stability. In 1975 the Warriors, led by Rick Barry and coached by Al Attles, won the NBA championship. Ray led the team in rebounding and anchored the defense, finishing second in minutes played per game, after Barry. The Warriors defeated Ray's former team, the Chicago Bulls, in the Western Conference finals before sweeping the Washington Bullets in the NBA Finals.

Ray is one of a handful of players to have played at least ten seasons in the pros and to have recorded more rebounds than points for his career, a list that includes Basketball Hall of Famers Nate Thurmond, 
Bill Russell, Wes Unseld, Dennis Rodman, Dikembe Mutombo and Ben Wallace.

After his playing career, Ray worked as an assistant coach with the Dallas Mavericks in 1987. He also coached in the Continental Basketball Association, where he landed his first head coaching job with the Fort Wayne Fury, replacing former teammate Rick Barry as head coach at the end of the season. Later, he worked as a New Jersey Nets assistant before returning to Golden State as an assistant coach. He also worked as an assistant coach with the Orlando Magic and from 2005 to 2010 was an assistant coach for the Boston Celtics, who won an NBA championship in 2008. He was hired by the Sacramento Kings in 2012.

On June 5, 2013, new Kings coach Michael Malone announced that the 2012–13 assistant coaches would not be retained for the 2013–14 season. In 2016, Ray was hired by the Houston Rockets as a consultant.

Dolphin rescue
In 1978, Ray made headlines for saving a dolphin's life at the Marine World/Africa USA amusement park in Redwood City, California. A bottlenose dolphin named "Mr. Spock" had swallowed a bolt with a protruding sharp screw while maintenance was being performed on its holding tank. The park veterinarian was unwilling to perform a risky operation to remove the bolt from the dolphin's first stomach where the object lay just beyond his reach. His remark that he needed longer arms led Marine World president and basketball fan Mike Demetrios to ask for Ray's assistance, as his arms measured at three feet nine inches (114 centimeters). With gloves, lubrication, and guidance, Ray successfully reached into the animal's throat and retrieved the object without causing any additional harm.

See also
Bao Xishun, another person who used his long arms to reach into the stomach of a dolphin.

References

External links
 NBA Career stats at Basketball-Reference.com
 Bio from Boston Celtics official site
 Official Clifford Ray Radio Show

1949 births
Living people
African-American basketball coaches
African-American basketball players
American men's basketball players
Basketball coaches from South Carolina
Basketball players from South Carolina
Boston Celtics assistant coaches
Centers (basketball)
Chicago Bulls draft picks
Chicago Bulls players
Continental Basketball Association coaches
Dallas Mavericks assistant coaches
Golden State Warriors assistant coaches
Golden State Warriors players
New Jersey Nets assistant coaches
Oklahoma Sooners men's basketball players
People from Union, South Carolina
Power forwards (basketball)
21st-century African-American people
20th-century African-American sportspeople